Alfonso Enrique Domínguez Maidana (born 24 September 1965) is a Uruguayan former footballer who played as a defender.

Club career
Domínguez had a spell with River Plate in the Primera División de Argentina.

International career
Domínguez made 31 appearances for the senior Uruguay national football team from 1987 to 1990, including playing at the 1990 FIFA World Cup finals.

References

External links

 Argentine Primera statistics

1965 births
Living people
Uruguayan footballers
Uruguay international footballers
1987 Copa América players
1989 Copa América players
1990 FIFA World Cup players
Peñarol players
Club Nacional de Football players
Huracán Buceo players
Club Atlético River Plate footballers
Uruguayan Primera División players
Argentine Primera División players
Uruguayan expatriate footballers
Expatriate footballers in Argentina
Uruguayan expatriate sportspeople in Argentina
Copa América-winning players
Association football defenders